Street medics, or action medics, are volunteers with a minimum of first aid medical training supplemented by specific protest-related training, who attend protests and demonstrations as support or mutual aid roles to provide medical  and wellness care. Unlike emergency medical technicians (EMTs) or paramedics, who have undergone education for professional medical care, street medics usually operate under Good Samaritan clauses and use methods learned through specific protest-medicine training programs which individuals are required to undertake in order to be recognized as a trained street medic.

Street medics may treat trauma injuries, chemical agent and other crowd control weapon ailments, animal attacks, as well as general care for things like heat stress or cold exposure, epileptic seizures, and general well-being.

History 

Street medics originated in the U.S. during the Civil Rights Movement and anti-war movement in the 1960s. They conceived of medicine as self-defense, and provided medical support to the American Indian Movement (AIM), Vietnam Veterans Against the War (VVAW), Young Lords Party, Black Panther Party, and other revolutionary formations of the 1960s and 1970s. Street medics were also involved in free clinics developed by the groups they supported. The street medic pepper spray removal protocol (MOfibA - Mineral Oil followed immediately by Alcohol) was later adopted by the U.S. military. Because the MOfibA protocol can cause severe damage to the patient if done incorrectly, it was largely replaced by the LAW (Liquid Antacid and Water) protocol.

Interaction with law enforcement

Due to the nature of the work performed, street medics would inevitably be placed directly in the scene where a conflict between protesters and law enforcement occurs, which could bring potential harm to street medics. As identification, most street medics wear identifications that clearly display a red cross.

While combat medics on battlefields are protected by First Geneva Convention and must not be attacked while providing first aid, there is no agreement how should street medics be treated by law enforcement officers.

Street medics are often targeted by authorities in the United States and elsewhere, who both assault medics and destroy supplies.

See also
 Certified first responder
 Wilderness First Responder (WFR)
 St John Ambulance
 Battlefield medicine
 Ann Hirschman

References

Further reading 

 

Emergency medical responders
First aid